Li Shufu (born 25 June 1963) is a Chinese billionaire entrepreneur. He is the founder and chairman of Geely.

Early life
Li Shufu was born in Taizhou, Zhejiang. He earned a master's degree from Yanshan University.

Career
Li founded Geely in November 1986, now the second largest private automobile manufacturer in China.

On 28 March 2010, Geely signed a deal worth US$1.8 billion to buy Swedish automobile manufacturer Volvo Cars from American automobile manufacturer Ford Motor Company. It was the largest foreign purchase by a Chinese car manufacturer. Along with $900m of working capital from Geely and a commitment to build a Volvo factory in China, Li had a target of driving sales to 600,000 by 2015 in the domestic market.

In 2013, Hurun Report ranked Li the 63rd richest person in mainland China, with a net worth of US$2.6 billion.

Li announced in November 2018 that he has entered into an agreement with the China Aerospace Science and Industry Corp. to build a new line of supersonic bullet trains. The plan is for the trains to run using newly developed technology. Li said, "Core technology can't be bought. The more you use others' technology, the more reliant you become. We have to innovate on our own. The journey will be tough but the prospects are promising."

In 2018, according to the Financial Times, Li has become Daimler's largest shareholder, with a 9.7% stake in the German automaker.

In March 2020, Li was in talks with Volvo Cars to merge with Geely in his move to create a global automaker. Both Volvo and Geely are owned by Li's investment fund Zhejiang Geely Holding Group, but are being operated as separate entities.

In September 2022, Shufu's group acquired a 7.6% stake in Aston Martin.

Football sponsorship
Geely Group sponsored China's Jia B League team Guangzhou F.C. in 2001. However, after the 2001 China Jia B League Match Fixing, at the end of the season, Li ended his involvement in football sponsorship and was quoted as saying, "We won't come back until the Chinese football environment gets better."

Personal life
Li is married to Wang Li and the family reside in Hangzhou, Zhejiang.

Political life
Li is an independent non-party affiliated delegate to the 13th National People's Congress, serving as one of the 94 delegates selected from Zhejiang.

Economic views
Li has criticized the automotive industry joint venture system in China as producing large profits for foreign original equipment manufacturers (OEMs) and Tier 1 suppliers at the expense of innovation, quality and technology advancement by Chinese automotive OEMs. According to Li, this has led to complacency by domestic automotive OEMs by relying on profits from foreign partners through joint ventures instead of driving their own organisations to hire talent and improve, knowing they would control half of joint ventures run with profitable overseas manufacturers that generate healthy sales. He has previously argued for state-owned automotive manufacturers to partner with privately run companies.

References

1963 births
People from Taizhou, Zhejiang
Businesspeople from Zhejiang
Geely people
Volvo Cars
Billionaires from Zhejiang
Living people
Chinese football chairmen and investors
Chinese founders of automobile manufacturers
Automotive businesspeople
Volvo people
Lotus Cars
Chinese industrialists
Yanshan University alumni